Trentham Racecourse is the main thoroughbred horse racecourse for the Wellington city area in New Zealand. It is located in the suburb of Trentham in Upper Hutt, next to Trentham Military Camp.

The races are conducted by the Wellington Racing Club.

The first race meeting was held there in January 1906.

In November 2022 it was reported that a $12.4 million investment from the New Zealand Government's Infrastructure Acceleration Fund would be used in a new 850 home housing development and shopping centre on Trentham Racecourse land.  Mayor of Upper Hutt and Wellington Racing Club president Wayne Guppy said it would future proof the Club allowing it to upgrade its facilities and continue to operate, as well as boosting the Upper Hutt economy.  Tim Savell, the chief executive of RACE Incorporated, which administers racing clubs in the lower North Island, including the Wellington Racing Club, said the proposed work would provide the club with income and much needed new facilities.

Main races

Mid January
 G1 Telegraph Handicap; a 1200m open race.
 G1 Levin Classic; 1600m in January for 3 year olds.
 G3 Anniversary Handicap; 1600m open handicap. 
 G3 Trentham Stakes; 2100m open – set weight & penalties.
 Desert Gold Stakes; 1600m for 3 year old fillies.

Late January
 G3 Wellington Cup; 3200m (previously 2400m).
 G1 Thorndon Mile; 1600m.

March
 G2 Wellington Guineas; 1400m for 3 year olds.
 G1 New Zealand Oaks; 2400m for 3 year old fillies.
 New Zealand St. Leger; 2500m

July
 The Wellington Steeplechase over 5500m.
 The Wellington Hurdles over 3400m.

December
 G2 Wakefield Challenge Stakes; 1100m for 2 year olds.
 G1 Captain Cook Stakes; 1600m.

Trentham was also the venue for the Wellington Derby between 1966 and 1986. Linda Jones won the 1979 Wellington Derby on Holy Toledo, likely becoming the first woman rider to win a Derby anywhere on the world.

See also
 Thoroughbred racing in New Zealand
 Ellerslie Racecourse
 Riccarton Park Racecourse
 Tauherenikau Racecourse

References

External links
 Winners list (Wellington Cup) at Thoroughbred Heritage
 Wellington Cup Day at Trentham Racecourse

Sports venues in Upper Hutt
Horse racing venues in New Zealand